Marc Edworthy (born 24 December 1972 in Barnstaple) is an English former professional footballer. He started out playing as a right winger before being moved to right back. He was also occasionally deployed at left back and in central defence.

Career

Plymouth Argyle
Edworthy began his career with Plymouth Argyle in the 1991–1992 season.

Crystal Palace
Edworthy joined Crystal Palace who had just been relegated from the Premiership on 9 June 1995 for £350,000, and in his second season with the Eagles played an integral role in winning promotion to the Premier League. However, the next season Palace finished bottom and were relegated once more; in spite of this the Palace fans acknowledged Edworthy's performances and rewarded him with the supporters player of the year award. He scored once during his spell at Palace, his strike coming against Bury in the League Cup in September 1996.

Coventry City
On 26 August 1998, he was bought by Premiership side Coventry City for £1,200,000. He scored his first and what turned out to be only goal for Coventry in a 1–1 draw with Manchester City on 1 January 2001. With the Sky Blues he again suffered relegation, this time from the Premiership. He left at the end of the 2001–02 season to join Wolverhampton Wanderers.

Wolverhampton Wanderers
Edworthy started his Wolves career on 31 August 2002, helping them earn promotion to the Premier League via the playoffs, but left after just one season to join Norwich City on a free transfer.

Norwich City
In his first season with Norwich City he helped the Canaries win promotion to the Premier League. But again, he suffered relegation when Norwich finished in 19th place.
He left in the summer of 2005 to join Derby County, after a contract dispute with Norwich manager Nigel Worthington led to him becoming a free agent when his two-year deal expired.

Derby County
He was a member of the Derby squad that won promotion to the Premier League via the play-offs at the end of the 2006–07 season, being voted second in the Player of the Season contest along the way. He was appointed as a club ambassador at Pride Park in 2017.

Leicester City
Edworthy signed for Leicester City on 7 November 2008, signing a two-month contract that will see him stay at the club until 6 January 2009. He made his debut in Leicester's 3–0 FA Cup first round victory over Stevenage Borough, playing the full 90 minutes. On 6 January 2009 Edworthy agreed to stay at Leicester until the end of the 2008–09 season.

On 29 May, he was released at the end of his contract by Leicester alongside Paul Henderson, Patrick Kisnorbo, Bruno Ngotty and Barry Hayles.

Burton Albion
Edworthy was signed for Football League new boys Burton Albion on 4 August 2009, on a one-month contract by former Derby teammate Paul Peschisolido. He played in Burton's first ever Football League match at Shrewsbury Town but did not play again and was released after his contract expired. In October 2009, Edworthy announced his retirement after playing over 500 senior games in his 18-year career.

Career statistics

References

External links

Career information at ex-canaries.co.uk

1972 births
Sportspeople from Barnstaple
Living people
Association football fullbacks
English footballers
Plymouth Argyle F.C. players
Crystal Palace F.C. players
Coventry City F.C. players
Wolverhampton Wanderers F.C. players
Norwich City F.C. players
Derby County F.C. players
Leicester City F.C. players
Burton Albion F.C. players
Premier League players
English Football League players